Gerald David Shapiro (August 23, 1950 – October 15, 2011) was an American writer who had published three prize-winning books and was Cather Professor of English at  the University of Nebraska.  He was also a reader for Prairie Schooner.  He lived in Lincoln, Nebraska with his wife, the writer Judith Slater.

Education
B.A. and M.A. from the University of Kansas; M.F.A. from the MFA Program for Poets & Writers at the University of Massachusetts Amherst.

Academic positions
 University of Nebraska-Lincoln
 Harris Center for Judaic Studies

Awards
Honor Award in Fiction from The Nebraska Center for the Book and the Ohio State University Prize in Short Fiction and the Pushcart Prize for Fiction and the Edward Lewis Wallant Award for Jewish Fiction.  He has also been a finalist for the 2000 National Jewish Book Award for Fiction.  Also won a Merit Award from the Nebraska Arts Council's Individual Artists Fellowships program.

Works
His stories have appeared in Ploughshares, Witness, The Kenyon Review, Gettysburg Review, Missouri Review, Quarterly West, Southern Review.

Books published
 
   (reprint University of Nebraska Press, 2004)

Edited

References

1950 births
2011 deaths
University of Kansas alumni
University of Massachusetts Amherst MFA Program for Poets & Writers alumni
American male writers
Jewish American writers
21st-century American Jews